Kim Seon (fl. late 10th century) was a minor lord of the early Goryeo period, and the founder of the Eonyang Kim clan.  He was the seventh son of Silla's last king, Gyeongsun, and his mother was Princess Nangnang.  She was the youngest daughter of Taejo, founder of the Goryeo dynasty. 

As part of Taejo's general policy of incorporating the old leadership of Silla into Goryeo, Kim Seon was given lordship over the Eonyang area.

His descendants, the Eonyang Kims, included many leading officials of Goryeo.  One of these was Kim Bu-sik, a military leader and Neo-Confucian intellectual of the 12th century, author of the Samguk Sagi.  As of 2000, just over 38,000 South Koreans claimed descent from Kim Seon.

Notes

See also
History of Korea
List of Goryeo people

10th-century Korean people
Year of birth unknown
Year of death unknown
Date of death unknown